David Allan McLlwain  (born June 9, 1967) is a Canadian former professional ice hockey player. McLlwain is best known for playing for a record four National Hockey League (NHL) teams (the Winnipeg Jets, the New York Islanders, the Buffalo Sabres, and the Toronto Maple Leafs) in one season during the 1991–92 season. This record is shared with Dennis O'Brien, Mark Arcobello and Jussi Jokinen.

Playing career
Dave McLlwain played junior hockey in the Ontario Hockey League (OHL) with the Kitchener Rangers and North Bay Centennials. In his final year of junior he scored 46 goals and 119 points and represented Canada at the 1987 World Junior Ice Hockey Championships, famous for the Punch-up in Piestany brawl in the final game.

McLlwain was drafted by the Pittsburgh Penguins in the ninth round, 172nd overall in the 1986 NHL Entry Draft. During his NHL career, McLlwain bounced around from team to team frequently. He played for the Penguins (twice), the Winnipeg Jets, the New York Islanders (twice), the Buffalo Sabres, the Toronto Maple Leafs, and the Ottawa Senators. He played his final game in the NHL on March 29, 1997, for the Islanders against the Bruins, a game in which he recorded one assist. He finished his NHL career with 100 goals and 107 assists in 501 games.

McLlwain moved to Europe in 1997, playing for EV Landshut. He then played two seasons for SC Bern before joining Kölner Haie, where he ended his career in March 2009, after playing nine seasons with the club.

Career statistics

Regular season and playoffs

International

Transactions
 June 17, 1989 - Traded from Pittsburgh Penguins with Randy Cunneyworth and Rick Tabaracci to Winnipeg Jets for Randy Gilhen, Jim Kyte and Andrew McBain.
 October 11, 1991 - Traded from Winnipeg Jets with Gord Donnelly and a fifth-round pick in the 1992 draft (Yuri Khmylev) to Buffalo Sabres for Mike Hartman, Dean Kennedy and Darrin Shannon.
 October 25, 1991 - Traded from Buffalo Sabres with Benoit Hogue, Uwe Krupp and Pierre Turgeon to New York Islanders for Randy Hillier, Pat LaFontaine and Randy Wood.
 March 10, 1992 - Traded from New York Islanders with Ken Baumgartner to Toronto Maple Leafs for Claude Loiselle and Daniel Marois
 October 3, 1993 - Picked up via waivers by Ottawa Senators from Toronto Maple Leafs.
 March 1, 1996 - Traded from Ottawa Senators to Pittsburgh Penguins for eighth-round pick (Erich Goldmann) in the 1996 draft.
 July 29, 1996 - Signed as a free agent by New York Islanders.

References

External links

 Biography from Official Fanpage
 Page on Winnipeg Jets legends

1967 births
Living people
Buffalo Sabres players
Canadian ice hockey forwards
Cleveland Lumberjacks players
EV Landshut players
Ice hockey people from Ontario
Kitchener Rangers players
Kölner Haie players
Muskegon Lumberjacks players
New York Islanders players
North Bay Centennials players
Ottawa Senators players
People from Huron County, Ontario
Pittsburgh Penguins draft picks
Pittsburgh Penguins players
SC Bern players
Toronto Maple Leafs players
Winnipeg Jets (1979–1996) players
Canadian expatriate ice hockey players in Germany
Canadian expatriate ice hockey players in Switzerland